Wilson Gouveia (born October 3, 1978) is a retired Brazilian mixed martial artist. Gouveia formerly fought in the UFC. He is a 4th degree black belt in Brazilian Jiu Jitsu and is a member of American Top Team.

Mixed martial arts career
Gouveia hails from Fortaleza, Brazil, and fighting out of Coconut Creek, Florida. He defeated Wes Combs at UFC 62, Seth Petruzelli atUFC Fight Night 9 and Carmelo Marrero at UFC 71. In his UFC debut he lost to Keith Jardine by a unanimous decision at The Ultimate Fighter 3 Finale. He was also scheduled to fight Alessio Sakara at UFC 65 but Gouveia withdrew from the card. He was next scheduled to fight Jason Lambert at UFC 76 but had to withdraw due to a broken nose. The fight was re-scheduled for UFC 80, where Wilson Gouveia KO'd Lambert by a devastating left hook. Wilson Gouveia was then on a 4-win streak in the UFC, which was ended by Goran Reljic at UFC 84 when Reljic TKO'd Gouveia in the second round, the fight won "Fight of the night award". Gouveia recently got back on the winning track when he Submitted both Ryan Jensen due to an armbar, and Jason MacDonald due to elbows on the main card on Spike's Ultimate Fighter 8 finale.  Wilson lost to Nate Marquardt at UFC 95 via TKO due to strikes. 

Gouveia was scheduled to fight James Irvin on August 29, 2009 at UFC 102. However, Irvin was not able to fight due to a knee injury and was replaced by Ed Herman. Wilson was then forced out with a back injury and the bout was scrapped altogether.

Gouveia's latest fight was against Alan Belcher on December 12, 2009 at UFC 107 at a catchweight of 195 lb, which he lost by TKO in the first round. However, the bout was awarded Fight of the Night honors.

Gouveia was released from the UFC following his loss to Belcher. He left the company with a 6–4 record.

Post-UFC
Wilson was controlled and defeated by Ryan Jimmo on May 7, 2010 at MFC 25 via unanimous decision (30–27, 30–26, 30–26).

After a long layoff, Wilson returned to action against Dwayne Lewis. Throughout the fight, Gouveia attacked the lower part of Lewis' leg with kicks causing Lewis to collapse. Gouveia attempted to end it on the ground with a choke and a kimura before finishing the fight with punches.

Personal life
Wilson and his wife Fernanda have 4 sons named Wilson Jr, William, Wellison and Wesley Gouveia. Wilson also owns an American Top Team gym, ATT West Pines.

Championships and accomplishments
Ultimate Fighting Championship
Fight of the Night (Three times) vs. Seth Petruzelli, Goran Reljic, Alan Belcher 
Knockout of the Night (One time) vs. Jason Lambert 
Submission of the Night (One time) vs. Ryan Jensen

Mixed martial arts record

|-
| Win
| align=center| 15–8
| Wanderson Lima
| TKO (punches)
| Combate Brasil 2: Desafio
| 
| align=center| 2
| align=center| 4:16
| Fortaleza, Ceará, Brazil
| 
|-
| Win
| align=center| 14–8
| Kyle Keeney
| TKO (leg kick and punches)
| Fight Time 9: MMA Explosion
| 
| align=center| 1
| align=center| 0:50
| Ft. Lauderdale, FL, United States
| 
|-
| Win
| align=center| 13–8
| Dwayne Lewis
| TKO (punches)
| MFC 32
| 
| align=center| 2
| align=center| 3:19
| Edmonton, Alberta, Canada
| 
|-
| Loss
| align=center| 12–8
| Ryan Jimmo
| Decision (unanimous)
| MFC 25
| 
| align=center| 3
| align=center| 5:00
| Edmonton, Alberta, Canada
| 
|-
| Loss
| align=center| 12–7
| Alan Belcher
| TKO (punches)
| UFC 107
| 
| align=center| 1
| align=center| 3:03
| Memphis, Tennessee, United States
| Catchweight (195 lb) bout; Fight of the Night.
|-
| Loss
| align=center| 12–6
| Nate Marquardt
| TKO (knee and punches)
| UFC 95
| 
| align=center| 3
| align=center| 3:10
| London, England, United Kingdom
| 
|-
| Win
| align=center| 12–5
| Jason MacDonald
| TKO (submission to strikes)
| The Ultimate Fighter: Team Nogueira vs Team Mir Finale
| 
| align=center| 1
| align=center| 2:18
| Las Vegas, Nevada, United States
| Catchweight (189 lb) bout.
|-
| Win
| align=center| 11–5
| Ryan Jensen
| Submission (armbar)
| UFC Fight Night 15
| 
| align=center| 2
| align=center| 2:04
| Omaha, Nebraska, United States
| Submission of the Night.
|-
| Loss
| align=center| 10–5
| Goran Reljic
| TKO (punches)
| UFC 84
| 
| align=center| 2
| align=center| 3:15
| Nevada, United States
| Middleweight debut; Fight of the Night.
|-
| Win
| align=center| 10–4
| Jason Lambert
| KO (punch)
| UFC 80
| 
| align=center| 2
| align=center| 0:37
| Newcastle upon Tyne, England
| Knockout of the Night.
|-
| Win
| align=center| 9–4
| Carmelo Marrero
| Submission (guillotine choke)
| UFC 71
| 
| align=center| 1
| align=center| 3:06
| Las Vegas, Nevada, United States
| 
|-
| Win
| align=center| 8–4
| Seth Petruzelli
| Submission (guillotine choke)
| UFC Fight Night: Stevenson vs. Guillard
| 
| align=center| 2
| align=center| 0:39
| Nevada, United States
| 
|-
| Win
| align=center| 7–4
| Wes Combs
| Submission (rear-naked choke)
| UFC 62: Liddell vs. Sobral
| 
| align=center| 1
| align=center| 3:23
| Las Vegas, Nevada, United States
| 
|-
| Loss
| align=center| 6–4
| Keith Jardine
| Decision (unanimous)
| The Ultimate Fighter: Team Ortiz vs. Team Shamrock Finale
| 
| align=center| 3
| align=center| 5:00
| Las Vegas, Nevada, United States
| 
|-
| Win
| align=center| 6–3
| Kazuhiro Hamanaka
| KO (punches)
| Euphoria: USA vs. Japan
| 
| align=center| 1
| align=center| 0:39
| Atlantic City, New Jersey, United States
| 
|-
| Win
| align=center| 5–3
| Mike Delaney
| TKO (submission to punches)
| FCC 15: Freestyle Combat Challenge 15
| 
| align=center| 1
| align=center| 3:23
| Racine, Wisconsin, United States
| 
|-
| Loss
| align=center| 4–3
| Rory Singer
| KO (knee)
| KOTC 32: Bringing Heat
| 
| align=center| 2
| align=center| 4:55
| Miami, Florida, United States
| 
|-
| Win
| align=center| 4–2
| Ron Faircloth
| Decision (unanimous)
| AFC 6: Absolute Fighting Championships 6
| 
| align=center| 3
| align=center| 5:00
| Fort Lauderdale, Florida, United States
| 
|-
| Loss
| align=center| 3–2
| Ron Faircloth
| TKO (corner stoppage)
| AFC 4: Absolute Fighting Championships 4
| 
| align=center| 1
| align=center| 5:00
| Fort Lauderdale, Florida, United States
| 
|-
| Loss
| align=center| 3–1
| Hirotaka Yokoi
| TKO (punches)
| HOOKnSHOOT: Absolute Fighting Championships 2
| 
| align=center| 3
| align=center| 2:26
| Fort Lauderdale, Florida, United States
| 
|-
| Win
| align=center| 3–0
| Jon Fitch
| KO (knee)
| HOOKnSHOOT: Absolute Fighting Championships 1
| 
| align=center| 1
| align=center| 3:38
| Fort Lauderdale, Florida, United States
| 
|-
| Win
| align=center| 2–0
| Ahron Davis
| KO (punch)
| WEFC 1: Bring It On
| 
| align=center| 1
| align=center| 0:22
| Marietta, Georgia, United States
| 
|-
| Win
| align=center| 1–0
| Ray Casias
| Submission (armbar)
| HOOKnSHOOT: Kings 1
| 
| align=center| 1
| align=center| 2:59
| Evansville, Indiana, United States
|

References

External links

Wilson Gouveia's Gym

1978 births
Living people
Brazilian male mixed martial artists
Middleweight mixed martial artists
Light heavyweight mixed martial artists
Mixed martial artists utilizing Brazilian jiu-jitsu
Brazilian practitioners of Brazilian jiu-jitsu
Sportspeople from Fortaleza
Brazilian expatriate sportspeople in the United States
People awarded a black belt in Brazilian jiu-jitsu
People from Coconut Creek, Florida
Ultimate Fighting Championship male fighters